Hard soap or curd soap is a kind of soap. Examples are Nablus soap, Aleppo soap, Castile soap, and Marseille soap or savon de Marseille. During the preparation of the soap, common salt (sodium chloride) is added to the liquid soap mass. This leads to the soap mass separating from glycerin, resulting in a harder soap. It can be made using sodium hydroxide.

References

Soaps